Cancelloxus is a genus of clinids found in the southeastern Atlantic ocean.

Species
There are currently three recognized species in this genus:
 Cancelloxus burrelli J. L. B. Smith, 1961 (Slender platanna-klipfish)
 Cancelloxus elongatus Heemstra & J. E. Wright, 1986 (Whiteblotched klipfish)
 Cancelloxus longior Prochazka & Griffiths, 1991

References

 
Clinidae